Sher can refer to:

People 
 Sher, a Baloch tribe in Pakistan
 Sher-e-Bangla (Lion of Bengal), a popular title of 20th century Bengali statesman A. K. Fazlul Huq
 Sher-e-Punjab (Lion of Punjab), a popular title of Maharaja Ranjit Singh of the Sikh Empire

Surname 
Avner Sher (born 1951), Israeli architect and artist
Antony Sher (1949–2021), British actor
Barbara Sher (1935–2020), career/lifestyle coach, and author
Bartlett Sher (born 1959), American theatre director
Byron Sher (born 1928), American Democratic politician
Eden Sher (born 1991), American television actor
George Sher, American professor
Gila Sher, Israeli professor
Gilead Sher (born 1953), Israeli attorney
Izzy Sher (1912–1999), Jewish-American sculptor
Jack Sher (1913–1988), American director and writer
Julian Sher, Canadian journalist
Lawrence Sher (born 1970), American cinematographer
Neal Sher, American lawyer
Richard Sher (disambiguation)
Stacey Sher (born 1962), American film producer
Tamara Sher (born 1962), American psychologist
Zaheer Sher (born 1975), English cricketer, also known by his nickname, Bobby

Given name 
 Ali Sher (disambiguation)
 Sher Ahmad Khan (died 1861), Pashtun chief
 Sher Ahmed Khan (1902–1972), Kashmiri guerrilla commander
 Sher Ali (disambiguation)
 Sher Alam Ibrahimi (born 1955), Afghan governor and military commander
 Sher Bahadur Deuba (born 1946), Nepalese politician and former Prime Minister
 Sher Bahadur Kunwor, Nepalese politician
 Sher Bahadur Singh (died 2020), Indian politician
 Sher Bahadur Thapa (1921–1944), Nepalese army officer in the British Indian Army
 Sher Jung Thapa (1907–1999), Gurkha military officer
 Sher Lama (born 1973), Hong Kong cricketer
 Sher Malang, Afghan governor of Nimruz Province, Afghanistan under the Taliban government
 Sher Mian Dad (born 1968), Pakistani folk singer
 Sher Mohammed (disambiguation)
 Sher Muhammad, a Khan of Moghlistan from 1421 to 1425
 Sher Shah Suri (1486–1545), king of the Sur Empire in India
 Sher Singh (1807–1843), Sikh ruler of the sovereign country of Punjab and the Sikh Empire
 Sher Singh Attariwalla (died 1858), 19th century Sikh military commander
 Sher Singh Ghubaya (born 1962), Indian politician
 Sher Singh Rana, Indian criminal
 Sher Valenzuela, American political candidate
 Sher Ali Bacha (1935–1998), Pashtun revolutionary leader
 Sher Zaman Taizi (1931–2009), Pashtun journalist

Other uses 
 Sher (film), a 2015 Indian film
 Sher (poem), the common word for couplet in Persian and Urdu
 Sher (dance), a form of dance in Eastern European folk music, notably Russian and Klezmer music

See also
 Sher Shah (disambiguation)
 Falak Sher (disambiguation)
 
 Sherabad (disambiguation)
 Shear (disambiguation)
 Sheer (disambiguation)
 Shere
 Shere Khan
 Cher (disambiguation)
 Shir (disambiguation)